Nneka the Pretty Serpent may refer to:
 Nneka the Pretty Serpent (1994 film), a Nigerian horror drama film
 Nneka the Pretty Serpent (2020 film), a remake of the above